River Ridge Mall is an enclosed shopping mall in Lynchburg, Virginia. Opened in 1980, the mall features JCPenney, Belk, and Regal Cinemas as its primary anchors, with Jo-Ann Fabrics, T.J. Maxx, and Planet Fitness serving as secondary anchors. Three restaurant outparcels include Red Lobster, Taco Bell, and a local restaurant named Shakers, with a fourth outparcel being Salem, Virginia-based Kemba Roanoke Federal Credit Union.  A Residence Inn by Marriott is the mall's first on-site hotel.

The mall is majority-owned by Liberty University and managed by CBRE Group. The leasing agent has since changed to the Jones Lang LaSalle (JLL) group.

History
River Ridge Mall opened in 1980 with Miller & Rhoads and Thalhimers. Sears and Leggett (now Belk) opened in 1981. JCPenney opened in 1983. Miller & Rhoads closed and became Montgomery Ward in 1990, which closed in 1997 and became Value City in 1999. In 1992, the Thalhimer's store was converted to Hecht's, which in turn became Macy's in 2006. CBL & Associates Properties acquired the mall from Faison in 2003.

Value City closed in 2008 and was demolished for a new movie theater. As a result, the existing theater complex became a Planet Fitness. Jo-Ann Fabrics opened at the mall in November 2012, followed by TJ Maxx in April 2013. Also in 2013, the Sears store closed. It was purchased by Liberty University, who planned to convert to a civic center, but engineers found the site unsuitable.
On March 18, 2016 it was announced that Liberty University had purchased a 75% ownership position in the mall.

In February 2016, it was announced that Marriott was building a Residence Inn on the spot the former Montgomery Ward Tire & Auto building which had been vacant for some time.  This is the first hotel constructed at the mall property, and one of only 4 outparcels at the mall.

On January 4, 2017, Macy's announced the River Ridge location would be one of 100 underperforming stores it would be closing.  Liberty University, majority owner of the mall, announced they would purchase the Macy's building and have been in talks with a new unnamed tenant for the property, pending closure on the agreement.  In the same statement, former Liberty chancellor Jerry Falwell, Jr., confirmed that the former Sears building would be demolished and replaced with an outdoor shopping experience.  Both the new tenant for the former Macy's location and construction on the former Sears property are part of the University's overall plans for redevelopment of the shopping center.

In 2021, it was announced that there would be a refurbished food hall in Fall of 2021, including an Auntie Anne's, a Cinnabon, stone-fire pizza, an Asian restaurant by Sodexo, and hand-crafted burgers. It finally opened on October 19, 2021.

References

External links
River Ridge Mall

CBL Properties
Shopping malls in Virginia
Shopping malls established in 1980
Buildings and structures in Lynchburg, Virginia